The 1935 Tour of the Basque Country was the eighth edition of the Tour of the Basque Country cycle race and was held from 7 August to 11 August 1935. The race started and finished in Bilbao. The race was won by Gino Bartali.

General classification

References

1935
Bas